Monique Salfati (born 18 May 1945) is a French former professional tennis player. She was also known as Monique Di Maso during her tennis career.

Salfati, a two-time French national champion from Cannes, played Federation Cup tennis for France in 1967 and 1968, then appeared in the same tournament with Italy in 1974, following her marriage to Italian tennis player Gaetano Di Maso. She featured in a Federation Cup quarter-final for both countries.

Her best performance in a grand slam tournament was a third round appearance at the 1965 Wimbledon Championships. She had success as a junior, winning the girls' singles titles at the French Championships and Wimbledon, back to back in 1963.

See also
List of France Fed Cup team representatives
List of Italy Fed Cup team representatives

References

External links
 
 
 

1945 births
Living people
French female tennis players
Italian female tennis players
Wimbledon junior champions
French Championships junior (tennis) champions
Grand Slam (tennis) champions in girls' singles
Sportspeople from Cannes